Ilha da Queimada Grande, also known as Snake Island, is an island off the coast of Brazil in the Atlantic Ocean. It is administered as part of the municipality of Itanhaém in the State of São Paulo. The island is small in size, only , and has a temperate climate. The island's terrain varies considerably, ranging from bare rock to rainforest.

The island is the only natural home of the critically endangered, venomous Bothrops insularis (golden lancehead pit viper), which has a diet of birds. The snakes became trapped on the island thousands of years ago following the end of the last ice age when rising ocean levels disconnected the island from the mainland. The ensuing evolutionary pressure allowed the snakes to adapt to their new environment, increasing rapidly in population and rendering the island dangerous to public visitation.

Queimada Grande is closed to the public in order to protect both people and the snake population; access is available only to the Brazilian Navy and selected researchers vetted by the Chico Mendes Institute for Biodiversity Conservation, the Brazilian federal conservation unit.

Geography

The island has a temperate climate that is similar to that of its neighbouring island Nimer.  of the island is covered by rain forest; the remaining areas consist of barren rocks and open grassland.

History 
Ilha da Queimada Grande has a variety of vegetation. The island is partly covered in rainforest and partly bare rock and grassy cleared areas, a result of deforestation. The deforestation is the origin of the island's name: the term "Queimada" is Portuguese for “forest fire” – when locals attempted to clear land for a banana plantation on the island, they attempted to clear rain forest with fire. A lighthouse was constructed in 1909 to steer ships away from the island. The last human inhabitants left the island when the lighthouse was automated.

The island and the Ilha Queimada Pequena to the west are protected by the  Ilhas Queimada Pequena e Queimada Grande Area of Relevant Ecological Interest, created in 1985.
The Brazilian Navy has closed the island to the public and the only people who are allowed on the island are research teams who receive waivers to collect data. It is blocked off to the public to protect human and snake life.

Endangered species 
Because there are so many snakes on one island — by some estimates one snake to every square meter (10.8 square feet) — there is competition for resources. Despite a population of 41 recorded bird species on Queimada Grande, the golden lancehead (Bothrops insularis) relies on only two: the Troglodytes musculus (southern house wren), which is usually able to avoid the golden lancehead as a predator; and the Chilean elaenia (a species of flycatcher), which feeds on vegetation in the same area as the snake.

The island was previously thought to have a population of about 430,000 snakes, but recent estimates are much lower. The first systematic study of the population of the golden lancehead found the number to be 2,000 to 4,000, concentrated almost entirely in the rainforest area of the island. This might have happened because there was a limited amount of resources and the population became level, but in 2015 an estimate by a herpetologist on a Discovery Channel documentary stated that the population remains at 2,000 to 4,000 golden lanceheads. The golden lancehead also may be at risk from inbreeding, effects of which are evident in the population.

Because of the overall low population of the golden lancehead, the snake was labelled critically endangered on the IUCN Red List of Threatened Species. It also was placed on the list of Brazil's endangered animals. The island is also home to a smaller population of Dipsas albifrons, a non-venomous snake species.

See also 
 Ilhas Queimada Pequena e Queimada Grande Area of Relevant Ecological Interest

References

External links
Atlas Obscura: Snake Island: Ilha da Queimada Grande
National Geographic Field Tale: Snake Island
Mark O'Shea's Lost Worlds
Vice News: Snake Island Full Length
Snake Island Brazil: Taste Of Poison Paradise

Queimada Grande
Areas of relevant ecological interest of Brazil
Geography of São Paulo (state)